Artsakh passports are issued to Artsakh citizens to travel outside the partially recognized Republic of Artsakh. They are also used as proof of identity within the country. Passports of the Republic of Artsakh are issued based on amendments to the Constitution of Artsakh of 2006.

Physical appearance
An ordinary Artsakh passport is dark red, with the Republic of Artsakh's coat of arms emblazoned in gold in the center of the front cover. It is almost identical to the Armenian Passport. The words "Republic of Artsakh" and  "Passport" in the Armenian and English languages also appear on the front cover. The passport is valid for 10 years from the time of issue, the contents of the passport are in the Armenian and English languages.

Travel and recognition
Due to the status of the state, the passport is not legally recognized by the international community and it is used only within the borders of Artsakh and three other post-Soviet disputed states; Abkhazia, South Ossetia, and Transnistria as all members of the Community for Democracy and Rights of Nations have agreed to abolish visa requirements for their citizens. In addition, citizens of Artsakh may travel visa-free to neighboring Armenia.

Artsakh permits dual citizenship, and as a result, a number of Syrian Armenian refugees were granted Artsakh passports when they immigrated in 2012.

See also

Armenian passport
Foreign relations of Artsakh
Republic of Artsakh
Political status of Artsakh
Visa policy of Artsakh
Visa requirements for Artsakh citizens

References 

Republic of Artsakh
Passports by country